Teratogenesis is the second EP by American thrash/death metal band Revocation. It was released for free through Scion A/V on September 25, 2012. It is the first release to feature Brett Bamberger (formerly of East Of The Wall) who handled bass duties following the departure of original member Anthony Buda. It is their first release to feature the use of seven-string guitars.

Track listing 

Writing credits taken from DarkLyrics.com.

Personnel 
 Revocation
 David Davidson – lead vocals, guitars
 Dan Gargiulo – guitars, backing vocals
 Brett Bamberger – bass
 Phil Dubois-Coyne – drums

References

External links 
 
 Teratogenesis free download at Metal Injection

2012 EPs
Revocation (band) albums
Thrash metal EPs
Albums produced by Chris "Zeuss" Harris